Alive at the Ladybug House is the second solo, acoustic album from The Slackers' keyboardist/lead singer, Vic Ruggiero. It was released in 2004. Recorded live at The Ladybug House in Pasadena, CA USA

Track listing 
 "Mean + Nasty" (2:45)
 "Vic's Lament" (2:36)
 "'Til the Early Morning" (4:12)
 "International War Criminal" (2:58)
 "American Psychopath" (2:53)
 "20 Flight Rock" (2:45)
 "Parking Lot" (3:06)
 "Yes It's True" (4:00)
 "Animales" (5:44)
 "86 The Mayo" (3:06)

References 

2004 live albums
Vic Ruggiero albums